is a JR East railway station located in the city of Kazuno, Akita Prefecture, Japan.

Lines
Rikuchū-Ōsato Station is served by the Hanawa Line, and is located 66.1 rail kilometers from the terminus of the line at Kōma Station.

Station layout
Rikuchū-Ōsato Station consists of one side platform serving a single bi-directional track. The station is unattended.

History
Rikuchū-Ōsato Station was opened on December 1, 1960 as a station on the Japan National Railways (JNR), serving the village of Hachimantai, Akita. The station was absorbed into the JR East network upon the privatization of the JNR on April 1, 1987.

Surrounding area
 
 Tohoku Expressway - Kazuno-Hachimantai Interchange

See also
 List of Railway Stations in Japan

References

External links

  

Railway stations in Japan opened in 1960
Railway stations in Akita Prefecture
Stations of East Japan Railway Company
Kazuno, Akita
Hanawa Line